Christian Lara (born January 25, 1939, in Basse-Terre, Guadeloupe, French West Indies) is a Guadeloupean/French film director, writer, cinematographer and producer. Having shot more than twenty feature films in the Caribbean, France, Canada, Africa, he is regarded by many as "the Father of French Antilles cinema".

Life and career 
Christian Lara began his professional career in Paris (France) as a journalist for Le Figaro, a French daily newspaper. As of 1973, he turns film-maker, directing his first movie, Jeu de dames (en: Dames play), starring Georges de Caunes. That same year, following a then Parisian trend for erotic films, Christian Lara directed Les Infidèles (en: The unfaithfulls), from a screenplay written by French erotic films director Daniel Daërt (born Jacques Godaert). The two men renewed their collaboration a year after, Lara working as camera operator on Daërt's ninth porn film, Cours du soir pour monsieur seul (en: Night classes for lonely men). 
He produced a more personal project with French actor Jacques Weber and newcomer Anne Parillaud: Un Amour de sable (en: Sandy Love), released in 1976.

Aware of the lack of visibility of his fellow Creole people on French movie screens, Lara soon engaged in creating a truly Antillean cinema. In this, he was following the advice legendary cinematographer Ingmar Bergman once gave him, at the time of a three-month stay in Sweden: "Only film what you truly know!"

For the first feature of his series of Guadeloupean films, Christian Lara wrote a storyline set during election time in his home island, calling upon Guadeloupean actors Greg Germain (at the time the new star of Médecins de nuit, a French medical drama television series) and Robert Liensol (an experienced movie actor) to star in the film. Overcoming ambient scepticism and the many difficulties attached to its production, Coco la Fleur, candidate was released on February 14, 1979, and received acclaim both in continental France and its overseas dependencies.

Several movies followed, among them Mamito, the portrayal of a grandmother caught in the social inadequacies of a former French overseas colony that became a full-fledged department of France. Released in 1980, the movie was already raising issues that would be brought up 30 years later during Guadeloupe's 2009 general strike.
Christian Lara was deliberately striving to follow in the footsteps of his grandfather, Oruno Lara (1879-1924), who was Guadeloupe's first historian of African descent, in featuring the history of the Caribbean, as is apparent from Christian Lara's subsequent historical feature films. 
First, in Vivre libre ou mourir (en: Live Free or Die Hard), Oruno Lara is credited as original screenwriter. Secondly, Lara himself acknowledges his grandfather's heritage in 1998 when Sucre amer (en: Bittersweet) is released; and again in 2004, when 1802, l'Épopée guadeloupéenne premiered in France on May 10, the very day of the National Celebration of the Abolition of Slavery. Several of his recent films, such as The Legend and Summer in Provence feature French actress Mi Kwan Lock in the leading roles.

Filmography as a director

Cinema 
 1973 : Jeu de dames
 1973 : Les Infidèles
 1976 : Corps brûlants (as Bart Caral)
 1977 : Un Amour de sable
 1979 : Coco la Fleur, candidate
 1980 : Mamito
 1980 : Chap'la
 1980 : Vivre libre ou mourir
 1982 : Une glace avec deux boules...
 1983 : Adieu foulards
 1987 : Black
 1993 : Une Sacrée chabine
 1998 : Sucre Amer
 2004 : 1802, l'Épopée guadeloupéenne
 2004 : Cracking Up
 2010 : Héritage perdu
 2011 : Tout est encore possible
 2011 : 
 2012 : The Legend
 2012 : Summer in Provence
 2016 : Esclave et courtisane

Television 
 2009 : Le Mystère Joséphine

Awards, nominations and distinctions
 1999 - FESPACO's Paul Robeson African Diaspora best film award for Sucre Amer, (Burkina Faso).

Sources

External links 

Christian Lara on Encyclociné .
Caraibe-Films Official website

1939 births
Living people
French film directors
Guadeloupean film directors
People from Pointe-à-Pitre